The 1994 USA Outdoor Track and Field Championships was organised by USA Track & Field and held from June 15 to 22 at Tom Black Track at LaPorte Stadium, on the campus of the University of Tennessee in Knoxville, Tennessee. The primarily four-day competition served as the national championships in track and field for the United States.  The women's 3000 meters was held four days after the primary meet on June 22.

Results

Men track events

Men field events

Women track events

Women field events

References

 Results from T&FN
 results

USA Outdoor Track and Field Championships
USA Outdoors
Track, Outdoor
Sports in Knoxville, Tennessee
USA Outdoor Track and Field Championships
Track and field in Tennessee